John Isner was the two-time defending champion, but withdrew from the tournament because of a hip injury.
Jürgen Melzer won the title, defeating Gaël Monfils in the final, 6–3, 2–1, ret.

Seeds
All seeds received a bye into the second round.

Draw

Finals

Top half

Section 1

Section 2

Bottom half

Section 3

Section 4

Qualifying

Seeds

Qualifiers

Lucky losers

Qualifying draw

First qualifier

Second qualifier

Third qualifier

Fourth qualifier

References
Main Draw
Qualifying Draw

Winston-Salem Open - Singles
2013 Singles